Daya Shankar was an Indian cricketer who played for Gwalior.

Shankar made a single first-class appearance for the side, during the 1943-44 season, against Delhi. From the lower-middle order, he scored a single run in the first innings of the match, and 18 runs in the second. He took nine wickets with the ball during the match.

External links
Daya Shankar at Cricket Archive 

Indian cricketers
Gwalior cricketers